The Inter-Services Intelligence (ISI) is the largest and best-known component of the Pakistani intelligence community. It is responsible for gathering, processing, and analyzing any information from around the world that is deemed relevant to Pakistan's national security. The ISI reports to its Director-General and is primarily focused on providing intelligence to the Pakistani government.

The ISI primarily consists of serving military officers drawn on secondment from the three service branches of the Pakistan Armed Forces (i.e. the Pakistan Army, Pakistan Navy, and Pakistan Air Force), hence the name "Inter-Services"; however, the agency also recruits many civilians. Since 1971, it has been formally headed by a serving three-star general of the Pakistan Army, who is appointed by the Prime Minister of Pakistan on the recommendation of the Chief of Army Staff, who recommends three officers for the position. , the ISI is currently headed by Lieutenant-General Nadeem Anjum. The ISI director-general reports directly to both the Prime Minister and the Chief of Army Staff.

The agency gained global recognition and fame in the 1980s, when it backed the Afghan mujahideen against the Soviet Union during the Soviet–Afghan War in the former Democratic Republic of Afghanistan. Over the course of the conflict, the ISI worked in close coordination with the Central Intelligence Agency of the United States and the Secret Intelligence Service of the United Kingdom to run Operation Cyclone, a program to train and fund the mujahideen in Afghanistan with support from China, Saudi Arabia, and other Muslim nations.

Following the dissolution of the Democratic Republic of Afghanistan in 1992, the ISI provided strategic support and intelligence to the Taliban against the Northern Alliance during the Afghan Civil War in the 1990s.

The ISI has strong links with jihadist groups, particularly in Afghanistan and Kashmir. Its special warfare unit is the Covert Action Division.

History
The Inter-Services Intelligence was created in 1948 following the first Kashmir war, which had exposed weaknesses in intelligence gathering, sharing, and coordination between the army, air force, navy, Intelligence Bureau (IB), and Military Intelligence (MI). The ISI was structured to be operated by officers from the three main military services and to specialize in the collection, analysis, and assessment of external military and non-military intelligence. The ISI was the brainchild of the former British Indian Army major general Sir Robert Cawthome, then Deputy Chief of Staff of the Pakistan Army, and selected Colonel Shahid Hamid to set up the agency. Initially, the ISI had no role in the collection of internal intelligence, except for the North-West Frontier Province (NWFP) and Pakistan Administered Kashmir.

Naval Commander Syed Mohammad Ahsan, who was serving as deputy director of Naval Intelligence and played a pivotal role in formulating the procedures of the ISI, undertook and managed the recruitment and expansion of the ISI. Following the 1958 coup d'état, all national intelligence agencies came under the direct control of the president and Chief Martial Law Administrator. The maintenance of national security, which was the principal function of these agencies, came to mean the consolidation of the Ayub regime. Any criticism of the regime was seen as a threat to national security.

After Chief of Army Staff General Zia-ul-Haq had seized power on 5 July 1977, the ISI was expanded to collecting intelligence on the Pakistan Communist Party and Pakistan Peoples Party. The Soviet–Afghan War in the 1980s saw the enhancement of the ISI's covert operations. A special Afghanistan section (called the SS Directorate) was created under the command of Brigadier Mohammed Yousaf to oversee day-to-day operations in Afghanistan. A number of officers from the ISI's Covert Action Division received training in the United States, and "many covert action experts of the CIA were attached to the ISI to guide it in its operations against Soviet troops by using the Afghan Mujahideen."

Many analysts (mainly Indian and American) believe that ISI provides support to militant groups, though according to other analysts, these allegations remain unsubstantiated with evidence.

The ISI has often been accused of playing a role in major terrorist attacks across India including militancy in Kashmir, the July 2006 Mumbai Train Bombings, the 2001 Indian Parliament attack, the 2006 Varanasi bombings, the August 2007 Hyderabad bombings, and the November 2008 Mumbai attacks.

The ISI has been accused of supporting Taliban forces and recruiting and training mujahideen to fight in Afghanistan and Kashmir. Based on communication intercepts, US intelligence agencies concluded Pakistan's ISI was behind the attack on the Indian embassy in Kabul on 7 July 2008, a charge that the governments of India and Afghanistan had laid previously.

The ISI is believed to be aiding these organisations in eradicating perceived enemies or those opposed to their cause, including India, Russia, China, Israel, the United States, the United Kingdom, and other members of NATO. Satellite imagery from the FBI suggest the existence of several terrorist camps in Pakistan, with at least one militant admitting to being trained in the country. As part of the ongoing Kashmir Dispute, Pakistan is alleged to be backing separatist militias. Many nonpartisan sources believe that officials within Pakistan's military and the Inter-Services Intelligence (ISI) sympathise with and aid Islamic terrorists, saying that the "ISI has provided covert but well-documented support to terrorist groups active in Kashmir, including the al-Qaeda affiliate Jaish-e-Mohammed".

General Javed Nasir confessed to assisting the besieged Bosnian Muslims, supporting Chinese Muslims in Xinjiang despite a UN arms embargo, rebel Muslim groups in the Philippines, and some religious groups in Central Asia. The National Intelligence Directorate (NID) was formed in 2014 to pool and share intelligence gathered by over 30 of Pakistan's intelligence agencies to combat terrorism in Pakistan effectively.

Organization

A director general, who is traditionally a serving lieutenant general in the Pakistan Army, heads the ISI.  Three deputy director generals, who are serving two-star military officers, report directly to the director general with each deputy heading three wings respectively:
Internal Wing – responsible for domestic intelligence, domestic counter-intelligence, counter-espionage, and counter-terrorism.
External Wing – responsible for external intelligence, external counter-intelligence, and espionage.
Foreign Relations Wing – responsible for diplomatic intelligence and foreign relations intelligence.

Military officers of the armed forces as well as civilian officers from the Federal Investigation Agency (FIA), Federal Board of Revenue (FBR), Pakistan Customs, police, and judiciary make up ISI's general staff. They are recruited on deputations for three to four years and enhance the ISI's professional competence. Experienced army officers who perform well are given repeated extensions in their service. According to some experts, the ISI is the largest intelligence agency in the world in terms of total staff. While the total number has never been made public, experts estimate around 10,000 officers and staff, which does not include informants or assets.

The Wings are further divided into various directorates, which are sub-divided into departments, each directorate is usually headed by an officer of the Major-General, Air-Marshal or Rear Admiral rank.

Departments
 Covert Action Division
 Responsible for paramilitary and covert operations as well as special activities. Its roles are akin to the Special Activities Division of the CIA and a handful of officers are trained by the CIA's SAD. The division has been active since the 1960s.
 Joint Intelligence X
 Coordinates all the other departments in the ISI.  Intelligence and information gathered from the other departments are sent to JIX which prepares and processes the information and from there prepares reports which are presented.
 Joint Intelligence Bureau
 Responsible for gathering anti-state intelligence and fake drugs, fake currency, and TTP.
 Joint Counterintelligence Bureau
 Focused on foreign intelligence agencies.
 Joint Intelligence North
exclusively responsible for the Jammu and Kashmir region and Northern Areas.
 Joint Intelligence Miscellaneous
 responsible for espionage, including offensive intelligence operations, in other countries.
 Joint Signal Intelligence Bureau
 operates intelligence collections along the India-Pakistan border. The JSIB is the ELINT, COMINT, and SIGINT directorate that is charged with diverting attacks from foreign non-communications electromagnetic radiations emanating from sources other than nuclear detonations or radioactive sources.
 Joint Intelligence Technical
deals with development of science and technology to advance Pakistani intelligence gathering. The directorate is charged with taking steps against electronic warfare attacks in Pakistan. Without any exception, officers from this division are reported to be engineer officers and military scientists who deal with the military promotion of science and technology. There are also separate explosives and chemical and biological warfare sections.
 SS Directorate
Comprises officers from Special services group [SSG]. It monitors the activities of terrorist groups that operate against the state of Pakistan. The SS Directorate is comparable to that of the Federal Bureau of Investigation (FBI), National Clandestine Service (NCS), and is responsible for special operations against terrorists.
 Political Internal Division
Monitors the financial funding of the right-wing political science sphere against the left-wing political science circles. This department was involved in providing funds to the anti-left wing forces during the general elections of 1965, 1977, 1985, 1988, and 1990. The department has been inactive since March 2012 with the new Director General taking operational charge of the ISI.

Directors-General

According to Syed Irfan Raza, the Director-General of ISI is among the most powerful posts in Pakistan. For example, according to Mohammad Sohail, shares at the Pakistan Stock Exchange went down in October 2021 over concerns regarding the appointment of the Inter-Services Intelligence chief. The benchmark KSE-100 index fell 1.51%. According to retired air marshal Shahzad Chaudhry, three to four names are provided by the Chief of Army Staff, and the prime minister selects the Director-General from that list. The ISI chief serves for two to three years. According to Ansar Abbasi, before 2021, the appointment process of the Director-General followed no formal protocol other than verbal discussion between the prime minister and the head of the army.

Syed Shahid Hamid was the first head of the ISI. Hamid is said to have supported Field Marshal Ayub Khan's rise to power. After his retirement, Hamid helped President Zia Ul Haq.

Insubordination controversies 
The army has ruled Pakistan for more than half of its history and has been always unwilling to see its influence being compromised by any civilian leaders. In the 1990s, Prime Minister Benazir Bhutto appointed retired army officer Shamsur Rahman Kallu as Director-General, but army leaders refused to cooperate with Kallu, as he had refused to engage in martial-law duties under the previous dictator. In October 1998, Ziauddin Butt was chosen as Director-General. Though Butt was not the preferred choice of Prime Minister Nawaz Sharif, he grew close with Sharif, and Chairman Joint Chiefs of Staff Committee General Pervez Musharraf took over important ISI files. During a military coup a year later, Musharraf arrested Butt, who had been promoted to Chief of Army Staff by Sharif.

On October 6, 2016, the English daily Dawn published a report about a government meeting allegedly arranged by Sharif. The article detailed a  presentation by Foreign Secretary Aizaz Chaudhry about international pressure to crack down on Pakistan's extremist segments such as Masood Azhar, the Jaish-i-Mohmmad, Hafiz Saeed, the Lashkar-e-Taiba, and the Haqqani network. According to Ghazi Salahuddin of The News International, controversy ensued after the October meeting and the Dawn report, which lingered until May 2016. During the October 2016 meeting, Punjab chief minister Shahbaz Sharif allegedly revealed that, whenever action had been taken against certain extremist groups by civilian authorities, the security agency had worked secretly to free the arrested parties. According to Salahuddin Ghazi, information minister Pervaiz Rashid lost his portfolio over the Dawn news leak, and a government notification was released about the civilian government's decision after the meeting. On April 29, 2017, the Director-General released a tweet that said: "Notification on Dawn Leak is incomplete and not in line with recommendations by the Inquiry Board. Notification is rejected." Ghazi stated that a meeting was eventually held between the prime minister and the Chief of Army Staff, and a press conference was held to announce the decision to withdraw the tweet.

2021 disagreement over appointment of ISI Chief
The mainstream media of Pakistan broke the news about the ongoing (October 2021) constitutional rift between civil and armed wings over the appointment of the D.G. post only after ministers spoke on the matter. In the first week, October 6, 2021, the Pakistan military's media affairs wing announced the replacement of Faiz Hameed with Nadeem Anjum. After 2 days, it first came to light in social media that the federal government of Pakistan had yet to issue any formal notification for the appointment of the new DG ISI.  Rumors got credence further when Gen. Faiz attended the National Security Committee meeting instead of the expected new DG ISI.

A week later on 13 October 2021 Information Minister Fawad Chaudhry informed media that the process of a fresh appointment of DG ISI is still underway and that the selection is Prime Minister Imran Khan's prerogative. He also noted that the Army chief and the Prime Minister are in agreement about following correct procedures of appointment according to the Constitution.

Malik Dogar, the Special Assistant to the Prime Minister on Political Affairs, later said in a talk show that PM Imran Khan wanted General Faiz to continue as DG ISI for some more months after taking into consideration the expertise of General Faiz on the situation in Afghanistan. Dogar further stated that during the cabinet meeting, the prime minister stressed that if the army is a respected institution then the PM Office is also a respected one.

Headquarters
The ISI is headquartered in Pakistan's capital, Islamabad. The complex consists of various low-rise buildings separated by lawns and fountains. The entrance to the complex is next to a private hospital. Declan Walsh of The Guardian said that the entrance is "suitably discreet: no sign, just a plainclothes officer packing a pistol who directs visitors through a chicane of barriers, soldiers, and sniffer dogs". Walsh said that the complex "resembles a well-funded private university" and that the buildings are "neatly tended," the lawns are "smooth," and the fountains are "tinkling." He described the central building, which houses the director general's office on the top floor, as "a modern structure with a round, echoing lobby".

Recruitment and training
Both civilians and members of the armed forces can join the ISI. For civilians, recruitment is advertised and is jointly handled by the Federal Public Services Commission (FPSC) and civilian ISI agents are considered employees of the Ministry of Defence. The FPSC conducts various examinations testing the candidate's knowledge of current affairs, English, and various analytical abilities. Based on the results, the FPSC shortlists the candidates and sends the list to the ISI who conduct the initial background checks. Selected candidates are then invited for an interview which is conducted by a joint committee comprising both ISI and FPSC officials. The selected persons are then sent to the Defence Services Intelligence Academy (DSIA) for six months of training. Later, these officers are transferred to different sections for open source information where they serve for five years. After five years of basic service, officers are entrusted with sensitive jobs and declared the core team of ISI.

Major operations

Functions

 Collection of information and extraction of intelligence from information
 ISI obtains information critical to Pakistan's strategic interests.  Both overt and covert means are adopted.
 Classification of intelligence

 Data is sifted through, classified as appropriate, and filed with the assistance of the computer network in ISI's headquarters in Islamabad.
 Aggressive intelligence
 The primary mission of ISI includes aggressive intelligence which comprises espionage, psychological warfare, subversion, and sabotage.
 Counterintelligence
 ISI has a dedicated section which spies against enemy intelligence collection.

Methods

 Diplomatic missions
 Diplomatic missions provide an ideal cover and ISI centres in a target country are generally located on embassy premises.
 Multinationals
 ISI operatives find good covers in multinational organisations. Non-governmental organisations and cultural programmes are also popular screens to shield ISI activities.
 Media
 International media centres can easily absorb ISI operatives and provide freedom of movement.
 Collaboration with other agencies
 ISI maintains active collaboration with other secret services in various countries.  Its contacts with Saudi Arabian Intelligence Services, Chinese Intelligence, the American Central Intelligence Agency (CIA), and British Secret Intelligence Service (MI6) have been well-known.
 Third Country Technique
 ISI has been active in obtaining information and operating through third countries like Afghanistan, Nepal, Bangladesh, Sri Lanka, Iran, Turkey, and China.

By country

Afghanistan

 1982–1997
ISI is believed to have had access to Osama bin Laden in the past.  B. Raman, former Research and Analysis Wing (R&AW) officer now an Indian think-tank, of South Asia Analysis Group, claims that the Central Intelligence Agency through the ISI promoted the smuggling of heroin into Afghanistan to turn Soviet troops into heroin addicts and thus greatly reduce their fighting potential. The factions that were backed by the ISI were Gulbuddin Hekmatyar's Hezb-i Islami, and the forces fighting for Jalaluddin Haqqani.
 1986
Worrying that among the large influx of Afghan refugees who had come into Pakistan because of the Soviet–Afghan War were members of KHAD (Afghan Intelligence), the ISI successfully convinced Mansoor Ahmed, who was the chargé d'affaires of the Afghan Embassy in Islamabad, to turn his back on the Soviet-backed Afghan government. He and his family were secretly escorted out of their residence and given safe passage on a London-bound British Airways flight in exchange for classified information in regard to Afghan agents in Pakistan. The Soviet and Afghan diplomats tried unsuccessfully to find the family.
 1990
According to Peter Tomsen, the United States Special Envoy to Afghanistan, neighboring Pakistan had tried to install Gulbuddin Hekmatyar in power in Afghanistan against the opposition of all other mujahideen commanders and factions as early as 1990. In October 1990, the ISI had devised a plan for Hekmatyar to conduct a mass bombardment of the Afghan capital Kabul, then still under communist rule, with possible Pakistani troop reinforcements. This unilateral ISI-Hekmatyar plan came although the thirty most important mujahideen commanders had agreed to hold a conference inclusive of all Afghan groups to decide on a common future strategy. The United States finally put pressure on Pakistan to stop the 1990 plan, which was subsequently called off until 1992.
 1994
 The Taliban regime is widely accepted to have been supported by the ISI and the Pakistani military from 1994 to 2001, which Pakistan officially denied during that time. Then-Pakistani president, Pervez Musharraf, now admits to supporting the Taliban until 9/11. According to Pakistani Afghanistan expert Ahmed Rashid, "between 1994 and 1999, an estimated 80,000 to 100,000 Pakistanis trained and fought in Afghanistan" on the side of the Taliban. Following the 9/11 attack on the United States by Al-Qaeda, Pakistan says it felt it necessary to cooperate with the US. Others, however, maintain Pakistan continues to support the Afghan Taliban, which Pakistan rejects.
 2008
 Militants attacked the Indian Consulate General in Jalalabad in 2007. According to Afghanistan's National Directorate of Security, individuals arrested by the Afghan government stated that the ISI was behind the attack and had given them ₹120,000 for the operation.
 2001 onwards
 American officials believe members of the Pakistani intelligence service are alerting militants to imminent American missile strikes in Pakistan's tribal areas.  In October 2009, Davood Moradian, a senior policy adviser to foreign minister Rangeen Dadfar Spanta, said the British and American governments were fully aware of the ISI's role but lacked the courage to confront Islamabad. He claimed that the Afghan government had given British and American intelligence agents evidence that proved ISI involvement in bombings.
 2010
 A new report by the London School of Economics (LSE) claimed to provide the most concrete evidence yet that the ISI is providing funding, training, and sanctuary to the Taliban insurgency on a scale much larger than previously thought. The report's author, Matt Waldman, spoke to nine Taliban field commanders in Afghanistan and concluded that Pakistan's relationship with the insurgents ran far deeper than previously realised. Some of those interviewed suggested that the organisation even attended meetings of the Taliban's supreme council, the Quetta Shura. A spokesman for the Pakistani military dismissed the report, describing it as "malicious". General David Petraeus, commander of the US Central Command, refused to endorse this report in a US congressional hearing and suggested that any contacts between ISI and extremists are for legitimate intelligence purposes; in his words, "you have to have contact with bad guys to get intelligence on bad guys".

Bosnia

 1993
 The ISI was involved in supplying arms to the Bosnian mujahideen in Bosnia-Herzegovina to prevent a total genocide of Muslims at the hands of the Serbs.

India

Indian intelligence agencies have claimed they have proof of ISI involvement with the Naxalites. A classified report accessed by the Indian newspaper Asian Age said "the ISI in particular wants Naxals to cause large-scale damage to infrastructure projects and industrial units operating in the interior parts of the country where ISI's own terror network is non-existent".

 1965
 The 1965 war in Kashmir provoked a major crisis in intelligence. When the war began, there was a complete collapse of the operations of all the intelligence agencies. They were apparently unable to locate an Indian armored division because of their preoccupation with political affairs. Ayub Khan set up a committee headed by General Yahya Khan to examine the agencies' workings.
 1969–1974
 According to Indian spymaster B. Raman, the Central Intelligence Agency and ISI worked in tandem with the Nixon Administration in assisting the Khalistan movement in Punjab.
 1980
 The PAF Field Intelligence Unit at their base in Karachi in July 1980 captured an Indian agent. He was interrogated and revealed that a large network of Indian spies was functioning in Karachi. The agent claimed that these spies, in addition to espionage, had also assassinated a few armed personnel. He also said the leader of the spy ring was being headed by the food and beverages manager at the Intercontinental Hotel in Karachi and a number of serving Air Force officers and ratings were on his payroll. The ISI decided to question the manager to see who he was in contact with, but then-president of Pakistan, Zia-ul Haq, intervened and wanted the manager and anyone else involved in the case arrested immediately. It was later proven that the manager was completely innocent.
 1983
 Ilam Din, also known as Ilmo, was an infamous Indian spy working from Pakistan. He had eluded capture many times but on 23 March at 3:00 a.m., Ilmo and two other Indian spies were apprehended by Pakistani Rangers as they were illegally crossing into Pakistan from India. Their mission was to spy and report back on the new military equipment that Pakistan would be showing in their annual 23 March Pakistan Day Parade. After being thoroughly interrogated, ISI forced Ilmo to send false information to his R&AW handlers in India. This process continued and many more Indian spies in Pakistan, such as Roop Lal,  were flushed out.
 1984
 ISI uncovered a secret deal in which Indian prime minister Indira Gandhi granted naval base facilities to the USSR in Vizag and the Andaman and Nicobar Islands, and the alleged attachment of KGB advisers to then-Lieutenant General Sunderji who was the commander of Operation Blue Star in the Golden Temple in Amritsar in June 1984.
 1984
 ISI failed to perform a proper background check on the British company which supplied the Pakistan Army with its Arctic-weather gear. When Pakistan attempted to secure the top of the Siachen Glacier in 1984, it placed a large order for Arctic-weather gear with the same company that also supplied the Indian Army with its gear. The Indians were easily alerted to the large Pakistani purchase and deduced that this large purchase could be used to equip troops to capture the glacier. India quickly mounted a military operation (Operation Meghdoot) and captured the entire glacier.
 1988
 ISI implemented Operation Tupac, a three-part action plan for covertly supporting Kashmiri militants in their fight against Indian authorities in Kashmir, initiated by President Zia Ul Haq in 1988  After the success of Operation Tupac, support of Kashmiri militants became Pakistan's state policy. ISI is widely believed to train and support militancy in the Kashmir region.
2014
 In February 2014 (disclosed in March 2015), the then-Indian chief of army staff General Bikram Singh issued orders to deploy troops along the borders with Pakistan in the Rajasthan and Jammu-Kashmir regions, but ISI got the information in a few hours and in reaction the Pakistan Army deployed its troops near the Indian borders which alarmed Indian authorities.<

 Home Minister Balochistan, Pakistan, Sarfraz Bugti revealed on 26 March 2016, that a serving Indian Naval officer, Kulbhushan Yadav, working for the Indian spy agency RAW was arrested in Balochistan by the ISI.

Pakistan

The ISI was accused of being involved in the Mehran bank scandal, in which top ISI and Army brass were allegedly given large sums of money by Yunus Habib, owner of the Mehran Bank, to deposit ISI's foreign exchange reserves in his bank.
 1980
 ISI became aware of a plot to assassinate the president of Pakistan, Zia-ul-Haq, and then launch a bloody coup to depose the current government and install an Islamic government in its place. The attempted assassination and coup were to occur on 23 March 1980, during the annual 23 March Pakistan Day Parade. The masterminds behind the coup were high-ranking military and intelligence officers and were led by Major General Tajammal Hussain Malik, his son, Captain Naveed, and his nephew Major Riaz, a former military intelligence officer. ISI decided against arresting the men outright because they did not know how deep the conspiracy went; instead, they kept the men under strict surveillance. As the date of the annual parade approached, ISI was satisfied that it had identified the major players in the conspiracy and arrested the men along with quite a few high-ranking military officers.

 1985
 ISI's Internal Political Division has been accused by various members of the Pakistan People's Party of assassinating Shahnawaz Bhutto, one Benazir Bhutto's two brothers, by poisoning in the French Riviera in the middle of 1985. This was an attempt to intimidate her into not returning to Pakistan to direct the movement against Zia's military government, but no proof has been found implicating the ISI.
 1987
 ISI failed to prevent the KHAD/KGB terror campaign in Pakistan in 1987, which led to the deaths of about 324 Pakistanis in separate terror incidents.
 1988
 ISI failed to prevent the mysterious assassination of the president of Pakistan, Zia-ul-Haq, in the crash of his C-130 Hercules aircraft near Bahawalpur which was possibly orchestrated by the KGB and KHAD and most likely supported by the Research and Analysis Wing (RAW)
 1990
 The ISI has been deeply involved in the domestic politics of Pakistan since the late 1950s. The 1990 elections, for example, were widely believed to have been rigged by the ISI in favor of the Islami Jamhoori Ittehad (IJI) party, a conglomerate of nine mainly rightist parties by the ISI under Lt. General Hameed Gul, to ensure the defeat of Bhutto's Pakistan Peoples Party (PPP) in the polls.
 2000s
 ISI engaged with the Pakistan armed forces in the War in North-West Pakistan against Tehrik-i-Taliban Pakistan, and so far is reported to have lost 78 ISI personnel, most notably Khalid Khawaja and Colonel Imam.
 2006
Rangzieb Ahmed brought a civil claim against MI5 for suggesting Pakistan's Inter-Services Intelligence agency arrest him in 2006 and colluded in torturing him by submitting questions which were put to him under torture in Pakistan.
 2011
 ISI arrested five Pakistanis who worked as informants for the CIA who passed information that led to the death of Osama bin Laden in the raid's wake. However, among them in particular, the US was trying to seek the release of Dr. Shakil Afridi, who ran a fake vaccination campaign that provided critical intelligence for the raid on the Bin Laden compound. However, the Pakistani government and military establishment refused to release Dr. Afridi, who has since been serving a 33-year prison sentence.

Libya
 1978
 ISI decided to spy on the residence of Colonel Hussain Imam Mabruk, who was a Military Attaché to the Embassy of Libya in Islamabad, after he had made some inflammatory statements about the military regime of Zia-ul-Haq. The spying paid off. He was seen talking with two Pakistani gentlemen who entered and left the compound suspiciously.  The ISI monitored the two men, who were later identified as Pakistani exiles who hated the current military regime and were Bhutto loyalists. They had received terrorist training in Libya and were ready to embark on a terrorist campaign in Pakistan to force the Army to step down from power. All members of the conspiracy were apprehended before any damage could be done.
 1981
 In 1981, a Libyan Security company called Al Murtaza Associates sent recruiters to Pakistan to entice former soldiers and servicemen to take high-paying security jobs in Libya. In reality, Libya was recruiting mercenaries to fight against Chad and Egypt, as it had border disputes with both nations. ISI became aware of the plot and the whole scheme was stopped. (See also CIA transnational anti-crime and anti-drug activities#Southwest Asia, Operation Cyclone, Badaber Uprising.)

Iran
 1979
 After the failure of Operation Eagle Claw, U.S. media outlets such as Newsweek and Time reported that CIA agents stationed in Tehran had obtained information regarding the location of the hostages, in-house information from a Pakistani cook who used to work for the U.S. Embassy. ISI successfully gathered evidence and intercepted communication documents and showed it to the Iranian Chief of J-2, which cleared the cook.

 2016
 A notable gangster of the Lyari Gang War, Uzair Baloch, who also holds Iranian nationality, was arrested in an intelligence-based operation by Sindh Rangers. In his hand-written confession, Baloch states that officials of Iran's Ministry of Intelligence offered him an all-expenses-paid residence in Tehran in exchange for providing sensitive information about the Pakistan Army's operations in Karachi. He says that the offer came through a third-party while he was staying in Iran's port city of Chabahar.

Iraq
2017
 After ISIS's defeat in Mosul, Iraqi envoy to Pakistan, Ali Yasin Muhammad Karim, held a press conference where he expressed his government's appreciation for Pakistan's help during the fight against the terrorist organization. He especially praised the intelligence-sharing of ISI and expressed interest in continuing the intelligence cooperation between the two countries.

France
 1979
 ISI discovered a surveillance mission at the Kahuta Research Laboratories nuclear complex on 26 June 1979, by the French Ambassador to Pakistan, Le Gourrierec and his First Secretary, Jean Forlot. Both were arrested and their cameras and other sensitive equipment were confiscated. Documents intercepted later showed that the two were recruited by the CIA.

Soviet Union and post-Soviet states
 1980
 ISI had placed a mole in the Soviet Union's embassy in Islamabad. They reported that the Third Secretary in the Soviet Embassy was after information regarding the Karakoram Highway and was getting it from a middle-level employee, a Mr. Ejaz, of the Northern Motor Transport Company. ISI contacted Ejaz who then confessed that a few months before, a Soviet diplomat approached him and threatened his family unless he divulged sensitive information about the highway such as the alignment of the road, the location of bridges, and the number of Chinese personnel working on the Highway. Instead of confronting the Soviet diplomat, the ISI gave him false information. This continued until the Soviet diplomat was satisfied that Ejaz had no further information and dropped him as a source.

 1991–1993
 Major General Sultan Habib, who was an operative of the ISI's Joint Intelligence Miscellaneous department, successfully procured nuclear material while being posted as the Defence Attaché in the Pakistani Embassy in Moscow from 1991 to 1993 and concurrently obtained other materials from Central Asian Republics, Poland, and the former Czechoslovakia.  After Moscow, Major General Habib then coordinated shipping missiles from North Korea and the training of Pakistani experts in missile production. These two acts greatly enhanced Pakistan's nuclear weapons program and their missile delivery systems.

United Kingdom

United States

 1980s
 ISI successfully intercepted two American private-sector weapons dealers during the Soviet-Afghan war of the 1980s. One American diplomat, whose name has not been de-classified, lived in the F-7/4 sector of Islamabad and was spotted by an ISI agent in a seedy part of Rawalpindi, drawing attention because of his automobile's diplomatic plates. He was bugged and subsequently trailed and found to be in contact with various tribal groups supplying them with weapons for their fight against the Soviet Army in Afghanistan. The second American weapons dealer was Eugene Clegg, a teacher in the American International School. One American International School employee and undercover agent, a Mr. Naeem, was arrested while waiting to clear a shipment from Islamabad customs. All of them were put out of business.

 2000s
 During the 2000s, the ISI was suspicious about the CIA's attempted penetration of Pakistan nuclear assets and intelligence gathering in the Pakistani lawless tribal areas. Based on these suspicions, it is speculated that the ISI pursued a counter-intelligence program against CIA operations in Pakistan and Afghanistan. ISI former DG Ashfaq Parvez Kayani is also reported to have said, the "real aim of U.S. [war] strategy is to denuclearize Pakistan".

 2011
 In the aftermath of a shooting involving American CIA agent Raymond Davis, the ISI had become more alert and suspicious about the CIA's spy network in Pakistan, which had disrupted ISI-CIA cooperation. At least 30 suspected covert American operatives have suspended their activities in Pakistan and 12 have reportedly left the country.

 A Chinese woman believed to be an ISI agent, who headed the Chinese unit of a US manufacturer, was charged with illegally exporting high-performance coatings for Pakistan's nuclear power plants. Xun Wang, a former managing director of PPG Paints Trading in Shanghai, a Chinese subsidiary of United States-based PPG Industries, Inc., was indicted on a charge of conspiring to violate the International Emergency Economic Powers Act and related offences. Wang is accused of conspiring to export and re-export, and exporting and re-exporting specially designed, high-performance epoxy coatings to the Chashma 2 Nuclear Power Plant in Pakistan via a third-party distributor in the People's Republic of China.

 Alleged ISI operative Mohammed Tasleem (although the Pakistani government never confirmed this), an attache in the New York consulate, was found by the FBI in 2010 to be issuing threats against Pakistanis living in the United States, to prevent them from speaking openly about Pakistan's government. US officials and scholars say the ISI has a systematic campaign to threaten those who speak critically of the Pakistani military.

Al Qaeda and Taliban militants captured
 Ramzi Yousef
 Ramzi Yousef, one of the planners of the 1993 World Trade Center bombing and the Bojinka plot. Pakistani intelligence, and the Department of State – U.S. Diplomatic Security Service (DSS) Special Agents, captured Yousef in Islamabad, Pakistan. On 7 February 1995, they raided room number 16 in the Su-Casa Guest House in Islamabad and captured Yousef before he could move to Peshawar.
 Ibn al-Shaykh al-Libi
 In November 2001, Ibn al-Shaykh al-Libi, a Libyan paramilitary trainer for Al-Qaeda, attempted to flee Afghanistan following the collapse of the Taliban, precipitating the 2001 U.S. invasion of Afghanistan. He was captured by Pakistani forces.
 Ahmed Omar Saeed Sheikh
 Sheikh Omar Saeed, a British-born terrorist of Pakistani descent, was arrested by Pakistani police on 12 February 2002, in Lahore, in conjunction with the Pearl kidnapping. Pearl had been kidnapped, had his throat slit, and then beheaded. Sheikh Omar Saeed was named the chief suspect. Sheikh told the Pakistani court, however, that he had surrendered to the ISI a week earlier.
 Abu Zubaydah
 Abu Zubaydah, an Al-Qaeda terrorist responsible for hatching multiple terrorist plots including sending Ahmed Ressam to blow up the Los Angeles airport in 2000. He was captured on 28 March 2002, by ISI, CIA, and FBI agents after they had raided several safe houses in Faisalabad, Pakistan.
 Ramzi bin al-Shibh
 Ramzi bin al-Shibh, an Al-Qaeda terrorist responsible for planning the 9/11 terrorist attacks as well as the USS Cole bombing and the 2002 Ghriba synagogue bombing in Tunisia. On 11 September 2002, the ISI captured Ramzi bin al-Shibh during a raid in Karachi.
 Khalid Sheikh Mohammed
 Khalid Sheikh Mohammed was the principal architect of the 9/11 attacks as well as other significant terrorist plots over the last twenty years, including the World Trade Center 1993 bombings, the Operation Bojinka plot, an aborted 2002 attack on the U.S. Bank Tower in Los Angeles, the Bali nightclub bombings, the failed bombing of American Airlines Flight 63, the Millennium Plot, and the murder of Daniel Pearl. On 1 March 2003, the ISI captured him in a joint raid with the CIA's Special Activities Division paramilitary operatives and Diplomatic Security Service Special Agents in Rawalpindi, Pakistan.
 Abu Faraj Farj al-Liby
 Pakistani intelligence agencies and security forces arrested Abu Faraj Farj al-Liby, mastermind of two failed attempts on President Pervez Musharraf's life, in May 2005.
 Maulvi Omar
 Senior aid to Baitullah Mehsud, captured by ISI in August 2009.
 Abdul Ghani Baradar
 The Taliban's deputy commander, Abdul Ghani Baradar, was captured by Pakistani intelligence forces in or near Karachi, Pakistan, in early 2010.

Reception
Critics of the ISI say that it has become a state within a state and not accountable enough. Some analysts say that this is because intelligence agencies around the world remain secretive. Critics argue the institution should be more accountable to the president or the prime minister. After discovering it, the Pakistani Government disbanded the ISI 'Political Wing' in 2008.

U.S. government
During the Cold War, the ISI and the CIA worked together to send spy planes over the Soviet Union. The ISI and CIA also worked closely during the Soviet–Afghan War supporting groups such as Gulbuddin Hekmatyar's Hezb-i Islami and Jalaluddin Haqqani, leader of the Haqqani network.

Some report the ISI and CIA stepped up cooperation in the aftermath of the 9/11 attacks to kill and capture senior Al Qaeda leaders such as Sheikh Younis Al Mauritan and Khalid Shaikh Mohammed, the planner of the 9/11 attacks who was residing in Pakistan. Pakistan claims that, in total, around 100 top level al-Qaeda leaders/operators were killed/arrested by ISI. Secretary of State Hillary Clinton said Pakistan is paying a "big price for supporting the U.S. war against terror groups. ... I think it is important to note that as they have made these adjustments in their own assessment of their national interests, they're paying a big price for it."

Other senior international officials, however, maintain that senior Al Qaeda leaders such as Osama bin Laden have been hidden by the ISI in major settled areas of Pakistan with the full knowledge of the Pakistani military leadership. A December 2011 analysis report by the Jamestown Foundation came to the conclusion that

Pakistani General Ziauddin Butt said Bin Laden had been hidden in Abbottabad by the ISI "with the full knowledge" of General Pervez Musharraf but later denied making any such statement, saying his words were altered by the media, he said: "It is the hobby of the Western media to distort the facts for their own purposes." U.S. military officials have increasingly said they do not notify Pakistani officials before conducting operations against the Afghan Taliban or Al Qaeda, because they fear Pakistani officials may tip them off.
International officials have accused the ISI of continuing to support and even lead the Taliban during the 2001-2021 War in Afghanistan. As Chairman of the Joint Chiefs of Staff, Mike Mullen stated:

The Associated Press reported that "the president said Mullen's statement 'expressed frustration' over the insurgent safe havens in Pakistan. But Obama said 'the intelligence is not as clear as we might like in terms of what exactly that relationship is.' Obama added that whether Pakistan's ties with the Haqqani network are active or passive, Pakistan has to deal with it."

The Guantanamo Bay files leak, however, showed that the US authorities unofficially consider the ISI a terrorist organization that was equally as dangerous as Al Qaeda and the Taliban, and many allegations of it supporting terrorist activities have been made.

In 2017, General Joseph Dunford, chairman of the Joint Chiefs of Staff, accused the ISI of having ties to terror groups. In a Senate hearing, Dunford told members of the U.S. Senate: "It is clear to me that the ISI has connections with terrorist groups."

Indian government
India has accused the ISI of plotting the 1993 Bombay bombings and the 2008 Mumbai attacks. According to the United States diplomatic cables leak, the ISI had previously shared intelligence information with Israel regarding possible terrorist attacks against Jewish and Israeli sites in India in late 2008. ISI is also accused of supporting pro independence militias in Jammu and Kashmir while Pakistan denies all such claims, or says it gives them moral support only.

Controversies
The ISI has long been accused of using designated terrorist groups and militants to conduct proxy wars against its neighbors. According to Grant Holt and David H. Gray, "The agency specializes in utilizing terrorist organizations as proxies for Pakistani foreign policy, covert action abroad, and controlling domestic politics." James Forest says, "There has been increasing proof from counter-terrorism organizations that militants and the Taliban continue to receive assistance from the ISI, as well as the establishment of camps to train terrorists on Pakistani territory." All external operations are carried out under the supervision of the ISI's S Wing. The agency is divided into eight divisions. Joint Intelligence/North(JIN) is responsible for conducting operations in Jammu and Kashmir and Afghanistan. The Joint Signal Intelligence Bureau (JSIB) provides support with communications to groups in Jammu and Kashmir. According to Daniel Benjamin and Steven Simon, both former members of the National Security Council, the ISI acted as a "kind of terrorist conveyor belt" radicalizing young men in the Madrassas in Pakistan and delivering them to training camps affiliated with or run by Al-Qaeda and from there moving them into Jammu and Kashmir to launch attacks.

Support for militants
From the 1990s, the ISI began courting the Jihadists who had emerged from the conflict against the Soviet Union in Afghanistan and by 2000 the majority of militant groups operating in Kashmir were based in Pakistan or were pro-Pakistan. These groups are used to conduct a low-intensity conflict against India. According to Stephen P. Cohen and John Wilson, the ISI's aid to and creation of designated terrorist groups and religious extremist groups is well-documented. The ISI have been accused of having close ties to Lashkar-e-Taiba who carried out the attacks in Mumbai in 2008. The ISI have also given aid to Hizbul Mujahideen. Terrorism expert Gus Martin has said, "The ISI has a long history of supporting designated terrorist groups and pro-Independence groups operating in Punjab and Jammu and Kashmir which fight against Indian interests." The ISI also helped with the founding of the group Jaish-e-Mohammed.

Hizbul Mujahideen
The group, Hizbul Mujahideen, was created as the Kashmiri branch of Jamaat-i-Islami. It has been reported that JI founded Hizbul Mujahideen at the request of the ISI to counter the Jammu and Kashmir Liberation Front (JKLF) who are advocates for the independence of Kashmir. The failure of 1987 elections in Kashmir, and afterwards the arrest of Muhammad Yusuf, a.k.a. Syed Salahuddin, led to the events that created armed struggle in the valley.

Al-Badr
There have been three incarnations of the group Al-Badr. According to Peter Tomsen, the ISI, in conjunction with Jamaat-e-Islami, formed the first Al-Badr, who resisted the Indian-trained influx of Mukti Bahini in Bangladesh in the 1970s.

Al-Qaeda and bin Laden

The ISI supported Al-Qaeda during the war along with the CIA against the Soviet government, through the Taliban, and it is believed by some that there is still contact between Al-Qaeda and the ISI. An assessment by British Intelligence in 2000 into Al-Qaeda training camps in Afghanistan showed the ISI were playing an active role in some of them. In 2002, it was alleged that when the Egyptian investigators tracked down Al-Qaeda member Ahmed Said Khadr in Pakistan, the Egyptian authorities informed Pakistani authorities of his location. However, the Afghan Taliban at night came in a car and took Khadir along with them to Afghanistan. The next day, Pakistani authorities claimed they were unable to capture Khadir. The leak in 2012 of e-mails from Stratfor claimed papers captured during all the compounds during the raid in Abbotabad on Osama bin Laden's compound showed up to 12 ISI officials knew where he was and that Bin Laden had been in regular contact with the ISI.

Despite such allegations, Steve Coll states that as of 2019 there is no direct evidence showing Pakistani knowledge of bin Laden's presence in Abbottabad, even by a rogue or compartmented faction within the government, other than the circumstantial fact of bin Laden's compound being located near (albeit not directly visible from) the Pakistan Military Academy. Documents captured from the Abbottabad compound generally show that bin Laden was wary of contact with ISI and Pakistani police, especially in light of Pakistan's role in the arrest of Khalid Sheikh Mohammed; it has also been suggested that the $25 million U.S. reward for information leading to bin Laden would have been enticing to Pakistani officers given their reputation for corruption. The compound itself, although unusually tall, was less conspicuous than sometimes envisaged by Americans, given the common local habit of walling off homes for protection against violence or to ensure the privacy of female family members.

Al-Qaeda has repeatedly labelled ISI their enemy. Al-Qaeda claimed the Pakistani military and intelligence are their main targets in Pakistan. In 2019, Ayman al-Zawahari in a video message labelled ISI and the Pakistani military a "puppet" of the United States.

Harkat-ul-Mujahideen
Harkat-ul-Mujahideen were founded in the 1980s by the ISI to fight against Indian interests.

Jammu and Kashmir
in 1984, under the orders of Muhammad Zia-ul-Haq, the ISI prepared a plan for a rebellion, which was to be set in motion in 1991.

Haqqani network
The ISI have close links to the Haqqani network and contribute heavily to their funding. It is widely believed the suicide attack on the Indian embassy in Kabul in 2008 was planned with the help of the ISI. A report in 2008 from the US director of National Intelligence stated that the ISI provides intelligence and funding to help with attacks against the International Security Assistance Force, the Afghan government, and Indian targets. However, on 5 November 2014, Lt. Gen. Joseph Anderson, a senior commander for US and NATO forces in Afghanistan, said in a Pentagon-hosted video briefing from Afghanistan that the Haqqani network is now "fractured" like the Taliban. "They are fractured. They are fractured like the Taliban is. That's based pretty much on Pakistan's operations in North Waziristan this entire summer-fall," he said, acknowledging the effectiveness of Pakistan's military offensive in North Waziristan. "That has very much disrupted their efforts in Afghanistan and has caused them to be less effective in terms of their ability to pull off an attack in Kabul," Anderson added.

Attacks on journalists
Amnesty International published a document concerning the investigation of ISI over the murder of Saleem Shahzad.

Equipment
 The ISI uses different types of equipment connected and shared from Special Operations Forces. The primary weapons given to ISI Operatives are the FN Five-Seven, Heckler & Koch USP, and Glock pistols.

Losses
Since Pakistan launched its war on Al-Qaeda, the Taliban, and other jihadist groups, the country's armed forces, intelligence services (particularly the ISI), military industrial complexes, paramilitary forces, and police forces have come under intense attacks. The ISI has played a major role in targeting these groups, therefore, it has faced retaliatory strikes as well. , more than 300 ISI officials have been killed. Below are some major incidents when attempts were made to target the ISI.
 A suicide bomber drove his vehicle into a bus carrying officials killing at least 28 people on 28 November 2007, outside the ISI office in Rawalpindi.
 30 people, including four ISI officials and 14 policemen, were killed and over 300 were injured when three people attacked the ISI office in Lahore on 27 May 2009. The attackers fired at the ISI office and policemen present there. The guards at the ISI building fought back. During the incident an explosive-laden vehicle detonated.
 At least 13 people and 10 military personnel were killed when a suicide bomber blew up his van at the agency's Peshawar office on 13 November 2009. Around  of explosives were used which destroyed a significant portion of the building.
 Two attackers ambushed the Multan office where eight people were killed and 45 were injured on 8 December 2009. Two army personnel were killed while seven officials were injured. About  of explosives were used.
 A car bomb exploded at CNG Station in Faisalabad on 8 March 2011, killing 25 people and injuring more than 100. Taliban spokesman Ehsanullah Ehsan said that the nearby ISI office was the target. No losses of ISI personnel were reported, and only one official was injured.
 Three intelligence officials were killed and one was wounded when a vehicle carrying agency personnel was ambushed in FR Bannu on 14 September 2011.
 Four people, including ISI officials, were killed and 35 were injured when the local office of the ISI was attacked by five suicide bombers in Sukkur on 24 July 2013.

See also

 Afghan War documents leak
 Inter Services Public Relations
 Military Intelligence of Pakistan
 Operation Cyclone
 Pakistan and state-sponsored terrorism
 Intelligence Bureau (Pakistan)
 Pakistani intelligence community

Citations

General bibliography

Further reading

External links
 Pakistan Security Research Unit (PSRU)

 
1948 establishments in Pakistan
1949 establishments in Pakistan
Government agencies established in 1948
Information sensitivity
Military of Pakistan
Pakistan federal departments and agencies
Pakistani intelligence agencies